Brandon Jones (born April 2, 1998) is an American football safety for the Miami Dolphins of the National Football League (NFL). He played college football at Texas.

Early life and high school
Jones grew up in Nacogdoches, Texas and attended Nacogdoches High School, where he played football and ran track. As a senior Jones recorded 124 tackles, 16 tackles for loss, two pass breakups and two interceptions and was named the District 16-5A Defensive Player of the Year as well as first-team All-State and the Texas Defensive Player of the Year by USA Today. He was also invited to play in the 2016 Under Armour All-America Game. Jones was a consensus top-five recruit nationally at the safety position (Scout.com listed him as the #1 safety in the nation) and a top 50 prospect for his class. On National Signing Day, Jones committed to play college football at the University of Texas over offers from Alabama, Baylor, LSU, Oregon and Texas A&M.

College career
Jones played in all twelve of Texas' games as a true freshman with one start, making 16 tackles and blocking two punts. He was named a starting safety going into his sophomore season and finished the year with 61 tackles (four for loss), two passes broken up, and a forced fumble. He finished fourth on the team with 70 (5.5 for loss) tackles as a junior while also intercepting two passes, breaking up a pass, and recovering two fumbles despite missing four games due to a recurring ankle injury and was named honorable mention All-Big 12 Conference. Jones originally considered entering the 2019 NFL Draft following the end of the season, but ultimately decided to return to Texas for his senior year.

Jones entered his senior season on the watchlists for the Bronko Nagurski Trophy and the Lott Trophy. He finished his senior season with 86 tackles, 4.5 tackles for loss, in addition to adding two interceptions, a sack, a forced fumble and a fumble recovery and was named second-team All-Big 12. Jones finished his collegiate career with 233 tackles, 14 tackles for loss, one sack, two forced fumbles, three fumble recoveries and two blocked kicks with 11 passes defended and four interceptions in 47 games played.

Professional career

Jones was selected by the Miami Dolphins in the third round with the 70th overall pick in of the 2020 NFL Draft. He was placed on the reserve/COVID-19 list by the team on August 6, 2020, and activated the next day. Jones made his NFL debut on September 13, 2020 in the season opener against the New England Patriots, starting at safety and making ten total tackles. In Week 12 against the New York Jets, Jones recorded his first career sack on Sam Darnold during the 20–3 win.

On October 25, 2022, Jones was placed on injured reserve after suffering a torn ACL in Week 7.

References

External links
Texas Longhorns bio

1998 births
Living people
People from Nacogdoches, Texas
Players of American football from Texas
American football safeties
Texas Longhorns football players
Under Armour All-American football players
Miami Dolphins players